The women's 400 meter freestyle event in swimming at the 2013 World Aquatics Championships took place on 28 July at the Palau Sant Jordi in Barcelona, Spain.

Records
Prior to this competition, the existing world and championship records were:

Results

Heats
The heats were held at 11:22.

Final
The final was held at 18:57.

References

External links
Barcelona 2013 Swimming Coverage

Freestyle 0400 metre, women's
World Aquatics Championships
2013 in women's swimming